Skimmia arborescens is a small tree or shrub. It is grown as an ornamental plant. It ranges from the Himalayas to Southeast Asia.

References

arborescens